is a Japanese quiz video game released by Taito for the arcades in 1990, and later ported to the Super Famicom platform.

The game was featured in episode 72 (10th Season) of GameCenter CX. Yūyu no Quiz de Go! Go! (Director's Cut) is featured in the DVD-Box Vol. 6, released on December 18, 2009.

Summary
Yūyu was the nickname of Yukiko Iwai, a teen idol from the 1980s and early 1990s, who was a member of the pop group Onyanko Club.

References

External links
Yuuyu no Quiz de GO! GO! at Crunk Games
Soundtrack information (Super Famicom version) at SNESmusic
Yuuyu no Quiz de GO! GO! at The Arcade Flyer Archive

1990 video games
Japan-exclusive video games
Quiz video games
Arcade video games
Super Nintendo Entertainment System games
Multiplayer and single-player video games
Taito arcade games
Video games scored by Tamayo Kawamoto
Video games developed in Japan